Goer may refer to:

M520 Goer, an amphibious vehicle
 Goertek, also known as GoerTek, a Chinese company

People with the surname
Henci Goer (21st century), American author